Clypeodytes is a genus of beetles in the family Dytiscidae, containing the following species:

 Clypeodytes ater Bilardo & Rocchi, 1990
 Clypeodytes bedeli Régimbart, 1895
 Clypeodytes bicornis Bilardo & Pederzani, 1978
 Clypeodytes bufo (Sharp, 1890)
 Clypeodytes concivis Guignot, 1955
 Clypeodytes cribrosus (Schaum, 1864)
 Clypeodytes darlingtoni Watts, 1978
 Clypeodytes densepunctatus Biström, 1988
 Clypeodytes dilutus (Sharp, 1882)
 Clypeodytes divoi Biström, 1988
 Clypeodytes duodecimmaculatus Régimbart, 1899
 Clypeodytes eboris Biström, 1988
 Clypeodytes fartilis Guignot, 1951
 Clypeodytes feryi Hendrich & Wang, 2006
 Clypeodytes flexuosus Biström, 1988
 Clypeodytes gestroi (Régimbart, 1888)
 Clypeodytes hemani Vazirani, 1968
 Clypeodytes insularis Guignot, 1956
 Clypeodytes jaechi Wewalka & Biström, 1987
 Clypeodytes larsoni Hendrich & Wang, 2006
 Clypeodytes lentus Sharp, 1904
 Clypeodytes loriae (Régimbart, 1892)
 Clypeodytes meridionalis Régimbart, 1895
 Clypeodytes migrator (Sharp, 1882)
 Clypeodytes perlautus Biström, 1988
 Clypeodytes pertusus Guignot, 1950
 Clypeodytes procerus Omer-Cooper, 1959
 Clypeodytes proditus Guignot, 1942
 Clypeodytes pseudolentus Biström, 1988
 Clypeodytes roeri Biström, 1988
 Clypeodytes severini (Régimbart, 1892)
 Clypeodytes simplex Guignot, 1936
 Clypeodytes sordidipennis Régimbart, 1903
 Clypeodytes spangleri Biström, 1988
 Clypeodytes submarginatus Biström, 1988
 Clypeodytes viator Biström, 1988
 Clypeodytes weberi Biström, 1988
 Clypeodytes weiri Hendrich & Wang, 2006

References

Dytiscidae genera